Radiant Earth Foundation is an American non-profit organization founded in 2016. Its goal is to apply machine learning for Earth observation to meet the Sustainable Development Goals. The foundation works on developing openly licensed Earth observation machine learning libraries, training data sets and models through an open source hub that support missions worldwide like agriculture, conservation, and climate change. Radiant Earth also works on a community of practice that develop standards, templates and APIs around machine learning for Earth observation. According to scholar David Lindgren, the foundation „serves to make satellite imagery widely accessible and usable for development practitioners".

The Foundation is funded by Schmidt Futures, Bill & Melinda Gates Foundation, McGovern Foundation and the Omidyar network

See also

Notes

External links 

"Satellites and AI Can Help Solve Big Problems—If Given the Chance" Retrieved 2022-07-11
"The billionaire philanthropists intent on using satellites to save the world" Retrieved 2022-07-11
"Use of artificial intelligence and machine learning in NASA" Retrieved 2022-07-11

2016 establishments in the United States
501(c)(3) organizations
Non-profit organizations based in the San Francisco Bay Area
Organizations established in 2016
Foundations based in the United States
Internet-related activism
Remote sensing organizations